Roxboro Commercial Historic District is a national historic district located at Roxboro, Person County, North Carolina.  The district encompasses 48 contributing buildings in the central business district of Roxboro. The district includes notable examples of Classical Revival and Colonial Revival style architecture. Located in the district is the separately listed Person County Courthouse.

The district was added to the National Register of Historic Places in 1984.

References

Historic districts on the National Register of Historic Places in North Carolina
Neoclassical architecture in North Carolina
Colonial Revival architecture in North Carolina
Buildings and structures in Person County, North Carolina
National Register of Historic Places in Person County, North Carolina